Kreis Posen West was a Kreis in Prussia (county) in the southern administrative district of Posen, in the province of Posen.

External links

Districts of the Province of Posen